Abdul Malik (born 29 April 1937) is a Pakistani sprinter who won two international and four national gold medals, three international and four national silver medals, and one international bronze medal for Pakistan. He competed in the 4 x 100 metres relay and 110m hurdles. He participated in the 1960 Rome Olympics and the 1958 Asian Games.

His elder brother is Abdul Khaliq.

Malik was born in the small village of Jand in district Chakwal Punjab, Pakistan.

Medals (international)

References 

1937 births
Pakistani male sprinters
Pakistani male hurdlers
Olympic athletes of Pakistan
Athletes (track and field) at the 1960 Summer Olympics
Punjabi people
People from Chakwal District
Living people
Pakistan Army officers